The 1960 Cork Senior Football Championship was the 72nd staging of the Cork Senior Football Championship since its establishment by the Cork County Board in 1887. 

St. Finbarr's entered the championship as the defending champions.

On 23 October 1960, University College Cork won the championship following a 1-07 to 0-09 defeat of Avondhu in the final. This was their fourth championship title overall and their first title since 1928.

Results

Final

References

Cork Senior Football Championship